Ontwa Township is a civil township of Cass County in the U.S. state of Michigan. The population was 6,549 at the 2010 census.

Geography
Ontwa Township is located along the southern border of Cass County, which is also the Michigan–Indiana line. The village of Edwardsburg is in the northwest part of the township. The unincorporated community of Granger, Indiana, borders the township to the southwest.

Several named lakes are in the township, the largest of which are Eagle Lake and Christiana Lake in the northeast. The unincorporated community of Adamsville is near the eastern edge of the township, along Christiana Creek, a south-flowing tributary of the St. Joseph River.

Demographics
As of the census of 2000, there were 5,865 people, 2,392 households, and 1,683 families residing in the township. The racial makeup of the township was 96.78% White, 0.31% African American, 0.84% Native American, 0.27% Asian, 0.03% Pacific Islander, 0.26% from other races, and 1.52% from two or more races. Hispanic or Latino of any race were 0.85% of the population.

There were 2,392 households, out of which 30.6% had children under the age of 18 living with them, 56.1% were married couples living together, 9.2% had a female householder with no husband present, and 29.6% were non-families. 24.2% of all households were made up of individuals, and 9.9% had someone living alone who was 65 years of age or older.  The average household size was 2.45 and the average family size was 2.88.

In the township the population was spread out, with 24.9% under the age of 18, 6.4% from 18 to 24, 29.4% from 25 to 44, 25.0% from 45 to 64, and 14.4% who were 65 years of age or older.  The median age was 39 years. For every 100 females, there were 101.7 males.  For every 100 females age 18 and over, there were 99.7 males.

The median income for a household in the township was $43,488, and the median income for a family was $50,364. Males had a median income of $36,601 versus $28,265 for females. The per capita income for the township was $21,691.  About 4.5% of families and 5.7% of the population were below the poverty line, including 7.5% of those under age 18 and 4.1% of those age 65 or over.

References

External links
Ontwa Township official website

Townships in Cass County, Michigan
South Bend – Mishawaka metropolitan area
Townships in Michigan